Tielen is a railway station in Tielen, Antwerp, Belgium. The station opened in 1855 and is located on Line 29.

Train services
The station is served by the following services:

Intercity services (IC-11) Binche - Braine-le-Comte - Halle - Brussels - Mechelen - Turnhout (weekdays)
Intercity services (IC-30) Antwerp - Herentals - Turnhout

Bus services
The following bus services stop near the station. They are operated by De Lijn.

200 (Turnhout – Vosselaar – Tielen – Kasterlee)
212 (Turnhout – Gierle – Lichtaart – Herentals)
493 (Geel – Lichtaart – Gierle)

References

External links
 Tielen railway station at Belgian Railways website

Railway stations opened in 1855
Railway stations in Belgium
Railway stations in Antwerp Province
Kasterlee
1855 establishments in Belgium